Red Force is a steel launched roller coaster located at Ferrari Land within PortAventura World in Salou, Catalonia, Spain. The ride was manufactured by Lichtenstein based Swiss manufacturer Intamin and opened on 7 April 2017.

Characteristics

Ride experience
Once the train goes over the top hat, it descends back down, again twisting 90 degrees to the left. This sends the train travelling parallel to the launch track but in the opposite direction. The train then enters a flat brake run and then ascends a small airtime hill before entering the final set of brakes.

Trains
Red Force's trains have three cars each. Each car seats four riders, allowing a total of 12 riders per train. The ride can accommodate approximately 1,200 riders per hour.

Track
The track is dark grey and the supports are red.

Launch

The ride uses supercapacitors to store and dissipate the energy needed to launch the train, reducing the peak load from the power grid necessary to launch the coaster.

See also
Top Thrill Dragster
Kingda Ka
2017 in amusement parks

References

Gigacoasters
Steel roller coasters
Roller coasters introduced in 2017
Roller coasters in Spain
Launched roller coasters
Roller coasters manufactured by Intamin